Acalolepta lessonii is a species of beetle in the family Cerambycidae. It was described by Xavier Montrouzier in 1855, originally under the genus Lamia.

References

Acalolepta
Beetles described in 1855